The Cascades Female Factory, a former Australian workhouse for female convicts in the penal colony of Van Diemen's Land, is located in Hobart, Tasmania. Operational between 1828 and 1856, the factory is now one of the 11 sites that collectively compose the Australian Convict Sites, listed on the World Heritage List by UNESCO. 

Collectively the Australian Convict Sites represent an exceptional example of the forced migration of convicts and an extraordinary example of global developments associated with punishment and reform. Representing the female experience, the Cascades Female Factory demonstrates how penal transportation was used to expand Britain's spheres of influence, as well as to punish and reform female convicts. 

Now operational as a museum and tourist attraction, the site is managed by the Port Arthur Historic Site Management Authority. The Cascades Female Factory Historic Site consists of three of the original five yards. It is open every day (except Christmas) and offers a range of tours.

History
Some rooms in the Macquarie Street Gaol served as a temporary Hobart "Female Factory" in the mid-1820s. The Cascades Female Factory was purpose-built in 1828 and operated as a convict facility until 1856. It was intended to remove women convicts from the negative influences and temptations of Hobart, and also to protect society from what was seen as their immorality and corrupting influence. The Factory was located, however, in an area of damp swamp land, and with overcrowding, poor sanitation and inadequate food and clothes, there was a high rate of disease and mortality among its inmates.

The Cascades Female Factory is the only remaining female factory with extant remains which give a sense of what female factories were like. It is included on the Australian National Heritage List. It was inscribed on the World Heritage list in July 2010, along with ten other Australian convict sites.

History and Interpretation Centre development

Between 2018 and 2019, almost 35,000 people visited the site. A design competition for a new History and Interpretation Centre was won by an international team composed of Tasmanian practice Liminal Studio, international firm Snøhetta and Melbourne landscape architecture practice Rush Wright Associates in 2018. In 2020, the State Government committed $3 million towards the new $5 million Visitor and Interpretation Centre to enhance the storytelling experience and increase visitation. The Federal Government contributed the remaining $2 million.

The Cascades Female Factory Historic Site was re-opened in March, 2022 with the launch of the new History and Interpretation Centre, with Honourable Madeleine Ogilvie MP and Honourable Dame Quentin Bryce delivering keynote speeches.

See also
 Female Factory

References

External links

 Cascades Female Factory Historic Site website
 Tasmanian Heritage Council information package
Old Photographs of Cascades' Female Factory, 1892

Defunct prisons in Hobart
Buildings and structures in Hobart
Prison museums in Australia
Museums in Hobart
1828 establishments in Australia
1856 disestablishments in Australia
Australian Convict Sites
Defunct women's prisons in Australia
Tasmanian Heritage Register
Convictism in Tasmania